Dato' Haji Abdul Rahman bin Mohamed Yassin (19 November 1891 – 24 May 1970) was a Malaysian politician who served as the 1st President of the Dewan Negara from 11 September 1959 until his retirement on 31 December 1968. His son, Ismail Abdul Rahman was the 2nd Deputy Prime Minister of Malaysia (1970–1973).

Awards and recognitions

Honours of Malaysia
  :
 Silver Medal of the Sultan Ibrahim Medal (PIS II) (1930)
  Knight Grand Commander of the Order of the Crown of Johor (SPMJ) – Dato' (1941)
  Second Class of the Royal Family Order of Johor (DK II) (1967)

Places named after him
Several places were named after him, including:
Kampung Dato' Abdul Rahman Yassin, a village in Kluang, Johor
SK Abdul Rahman Yassin, a primary school in Kluang, Johor
SMK Dato' Abdul Rahman Yassin, a secondary school in Johor Bahru, Johor

References

1891 births
1970 deaths
People from Johor
People from Muar
Second Classes of the Royal Family Order of Johor
Knights Grand Commander of the Order of the Crown of Johor
Malaysian civil servants
20th-century Malaysian politicians
United Malays National Organisation politicians